Oliva elegans is a species of sea snail, a marine gastropod mollusk in the family Olividae, the olives.

Description
The length of the shell varies between 30 mm and 53 mm.

Distribution
Oliva elegans occurs in the Red Sea, in the Indian Ocean off Mozambique and in the Western Pacific Ocean.

References

External links
 

elegans
Gastropods described in 1811